Charles Tsun-Chu Liu (born 1968) is an American astronomer and astronomy educator. His research interests include merging and colliding galaxies, active galactic nuclei, and the star formation history of the universe. He is a former director of the William E. Macaulay Honors College and The Verrazano School at the City University of New York’s College of Staten Island. He currently serves as a professor of physics and astronomy at the College of Staten Island, and as President of the Astronomical Society of New York. In 2019, he was named a Fellow of the American Astronomical Society.

Biography

Early life

Liu was born in Taipei, Taiwan to Fu-Wen (Frank) Liu, a professor of pomology and horticulture, and Jui-Chi (Janice) Liu, a nurse of obstetrics and midwifery, both of Taifu, Taiwan. He is the second of three children; his older sister, Grace, is a retired banker, and his younger brother, Henry, is a family physician. His family immigrated to the United States when Liu was four years old, and all of them were naturalized as U.S. citizens in 1980. He attended Harvard, graduating with a bachelor’s degree in astronomy and astrophysics and physics, and the University of Arizona, graduating with a Ph.D. in astronomy. He then held postdoctoral positions at Kitt Peak National Observatory and Columbia, where he conducted research on galaxy evolution and the star formation history of the universe.

Career

In 1998, Liu joined the scientific staff of the Hayden Planetarium at the American Museum of Natural History, where he helped design and develop the exhibitry and scientific content of the Rose Center for Earth and Space. During this time, with co-authors Neil deGrasse Tyson and Robert W. Irion, Liu wrote "One Universe: At Home In The Cosmos (2000)", for which Tyson, Irion, and Liu were awarded the 2001 Science Writing Award (scientist category) of the American Institute of Physics.

In 2003, Liu joined the faculty of the CUNY College of Staten Island (CSI). He was subsequently appointed to the consortial faculty of the physics doctoral program of the CUNY Graduate Center. His book, The Handy Astronomy Answer Book (Visible Ink Press), was published in 2004. In 2008, Liu became director of The Verrazano School Honors Program at CSI. In 2012, he also became director of the William E. Macaulay Honors College at CSI. He served as director of both of those programs until 2018. His book StarTalk: Everything You Ever Need To Know… (National Geographic) was published in 2016.

In 2013, Liu’s The Handy Astronomy Answer Book (Visible Ink Press) was published.

In 2015, Liu was elected as Education Officer of the American Astronomical Society, serving also as a Councilor and Trustee of the Society until 2018.

In 2016, Liu was elected as President of the Astronomical Society of New York.

Liu’s book 30-Second Universe (Ivy Press), co-authored with Karen Masters and Sevil Salur, was published in 2019. Also in 2019, he was selected as a Fellow of the American Astronomical Society.

In 2020, Liu’s The Handy Physics Answer Book (Visible Ink Press) was published.

Research

Liu is one of the original team members of the Cosmic Evolution Survey (COSMOS), the largest contiguous deep field ever observed with the Hubble Space Telescope. His work on that project has focused on faint, strongly star-forming galaxies. In 2015, he also joined the Mapping Nearby Galaxies at APO (MaNGA) project of the Sloan Digital Sky Survey, where he has been studying galaxies whose star formation activity has been quenched within approximately the past one billion years.

Personal life

Liu has been married to the mathematician/educator Dr. Amy Rabb-Liu since 1991. They have three children: Hannah, Allen, and Isaac.

References

College of Staten Island faculty
University of Arizona alumni
Harvard College alumni
1968 births
Living people